The alpha operon ribosome binding site in bacteria is surrounded by this complex pseudoknotted RNA structure.  Translation of the mRNA produces 4 ribosomal protein products, one of which (S4) acts as a translational repressor by binding to the nested pseudoknot region.  The mechanism of repression is thought to involve a conformational switch in the pseudoknot region and ribosome entrapment.

References

External links 
 

Cis-regulatory RNA elements